The al-Aqsa Martyrs' Brigades is a coalition of Palestinian armed groups in the West Bank. The organization has been designated as a terrorist organization by Israel, the European Union, Canada, Japan, New Zealand, and the United States.

Leadership

The leadership of the brigades and average members have identified themselves as the military wing of Fatah. On their website, and on posters, they post the Fatah emblem. The leadership of Fatah has said they never made a decision either to create the brigades, or make them the militant wing of Fatah. Since 2002, some leaders in Fatah have reportedly tried to get the brigades to stop attacking civilians.

In November 2003, BBC journalists uncovered a payment by Fatah of $50,000 a month to al-Aqsa. This investigation, combined with the documents found by the Israel Defense Forces (IDF), led the government of Israel to draw the conclusion that the al-Aqsa Martyrs' Brigades have always been directly funded by Yasser Arafat. In June 2004, then Palestinian Prime Minister Ahmed Qurei openly stated this: "We have clearly declared that the Aksa Martyrs' Brigades are part of Fatah. We are committed to them and Fatah bears full responsibility for the group."

On 18 December 2003, Fatah asked the leaders of the al-Aqsa Martyr's Brigades to join the Fatah Council, recognizing it officially as part of the Fatah organization.

Notable members
Notable members of the al-Aqsa Martyrs' Brigade (ordered lexicographically according to the last name) includes active militants and militants that were killed or arrested by the Israeli security forces.
 Raed Al-Karmi: General commander and founder the Brigades, Killed by Shin Bet in 14 January 2002 in Tulkarm. 
Naif Abu-Sharah: local commander in Nablus (killed by IDF).
Fadi Kafisha: former head of the Tanzim in Nablus; killed by IDF in 2006.
Sirhan Sirhan: Involved in the 2002 Metzer attack. Killed by Yamam in 2003.
Zakaria Zubeidi: local commander in Jenin, known for his relationship with Israeli far left activist Tali Fahima.
Samih Madhoun, senior leader. Killed in 2007 by the al-Qassam Brigades
Ibrahim al-Nabulsi, local commander in Nablus, killed in August 2022.

Militant activities

The Al-Aqsa Martyrs Brigades are responsible for numerous attacks in the West Bank, targeting both Israelis and Palestinians. In 2002, for example, they killed Ikhlas Khouli for collaborating with Israel. In November and December 2003, they killed the brother of Ghassan Shakaa (the mayor of Nablus). In February 2004 Shakaa filed his resignation from office in protest of the Palestinian Authority's lack of action against the armed militias "rampaging" the city. During the first three months of 2004, a number of attacks on journalists in the West Bank and Gaza Strip were blamed on the Brigades as well, including the attack on the Arab television station Al Arabiya's West Bank offices by masked men who identified themselves as members of the Brigades. Palestinian journalists in Gaza called a general strike on 9 February 2004 to protest this rising violence against journalists.

The al-Aqsa Martyrs' Brigades have taken prominent part in the July 2004 riots in the Gaza Strip, in which Palestinian officers were kidnapped and PA security headquarters buildings and policemen were attacked by gunmen. These riots led the Palestinian cabinet to declare a state of emergency. One media outlet described the situation in the Palestinian Authority as anarchy and chaos.

The al-Aqsa Martyrs' Brigades have carried out several joint attacks with the Islamist group Hamas. These attacks were committed mainly in the Gaza Strip. The al-Aqsa Martyrs' Brigades have also carried out joint attack with other militant groups such as Palestinian Islamic Jihad, The Popular Resistance Committees and with Hezbollah in the West Bank.

The European Union's Gaza offices were raided by 15 masked gunmen from al-Aqsa Martyrs' Brigades on 30 January 2006. They demanded apologies from Denmark and Norway regarding the Jyllands-Posten Muhammad cartoons and left 30 minutes later without shots fired or injuries.

On 9 June 2007, in a failed assault on an IDF position at the Kissufim crossing between Gaza and Israel in a possible attempt to kidnap IDF soldiers, 4 armed members of the al-Quds Brigades – the military wing of Islamic Jihad – and the Al-Aqsa Martyrs' Brigades – the military wing of Fatah -, used a vehicle marked with "TV" and "PRESS" insignias penetrated the border fence and assaulted a guard tower in what Islamic Jihad and the army said was a failed attempt to capture an Israeli soldier. IDF troops killed one militant, while the others escaped. The use of a vehicle that resembled a press vehicle evoked a sharp response from many journalists and news organizations, including the Foreign Press Association and Human Rights Watch.

On 14 July 2007, Zakaria Zubeidi, considered the local al-Aqsa leader for Jenin and the northern West Bank and has been wanted for many years for his armed activity against Israel, agreed to cease fighting against Israel after Prime Minister Ehud Olmert gave conditional pardon for 178 prisoners from the PA territories.

Notable attacks

Some notable attacks (including suicide bombings) committed by the group were:
January 2002: 2002 Hadera attack, when a gunman killed six and wounded 33 in a Bat Mitzvah celebration.
19 February 2002: Ein 'Arik checkpoint attack, near Ramallah, where one officer and five soldiers were killed.
3 March 2002: Wadi al-Haramiya sniper attack by a single sniper on an IDF checkpoint at Wadi al-Haramiya, near Ofra, where two officers and five soldiers were killed and five soldiers wounded. Three civilian settlers were also killed in the incident.
2 March 2002: The Yeshivat Beit Yisrael massacre in Beit Yisrael, Jerusalem – 11 killed.
5 January 2003: Tel Aviv Central bus station massacre – 22 killed.
29 January 2004: The Café Moment bombing in Rehavia, Jerusalem, bus line 19 – 11 killed.
22 February 2004: A suicide bombing on a bus in West Jerusalem – 8 killed.
14 March 2004: Port of Ashdod bombings – 10 killed (carried out together with Hamas).
24 March 2004, a Palestinian teenager named Hussam Abdo was caught in an IDF checkpoint carrying an explosive belt. Following his arrest, an al-Aqsa Martyrs' Brigade teenagers' militant cell was exposed and arrested in Nablus. On 23 September 2004, a 15-year-old suicide bomber was arrested by Israeli security forces.
16 October 2005: the al-Aqsa Martyrs' Brigades claimed responsibility for a shooting attack at the Gush Etzion Junction, killing three Israelis and wounding three others.
29 March 2022: 2022 Bnei Brak shootings, where a gunman shot five people dead in the Ultra-Orthodox Tel Aviv suburb of Bnei Brak before being killed. The Brigades claimed responsibility.

2007 amnesty deal
In July 2007, Israel and the Palestinian Authority reached an amnesty deal under which 178 al-Aqsa gunmen surrendered their arms to the Palestinian Authority, renounced future anti-Israel violence and were permitted to join Palestinian security forces. Later agreements in 2007 and 2008 added more gunmen to the list of those granted amnesty in exchange for ending violence, eventually bringing the total to over 300.

On 22 August 2007, according to Arutz Sheva, al-Aqsa Martyrs' Brigade announced that it was backing out of its commitment and promise to refrain from attacks against Israel and the Israeli backed amnesty deal giving amnesty to 178 al-Aqsa gunmen who agreed to stop militant activities against Israel and surrender their weapons. al-Aqsa said that it backed out of the deal due to the IDF's arrest of two militants who were supposed to be on the amnesty list. According to the IDF, they said they caught the two men at a checkpoint and said they were involved in "terrorist activity" which consequently mandated their arrest according to the stipulations of the amnesty deal. 
Shortly after backing out of the amnesty deal and its promise of stopping to attack Israel that Al Aqsa agreed to a month earlier, al-Aqsa gunmen in Gaza have announced that they are starting to launch hundreds of rockets and mortar shells at Israeli towns and cities and named the campaign, "Hole in the Wall II."

Popular culture
In the Sacha Baron Cohen movie Brüno, the character Brüno interviewed Palestinian Christian Ayman Abu Aita, who was portrayed in the movie as a leader of the militant group. The group released a statement to a Jerusalem-based journalist saying that it was "very upset" that it had been featured in the film.

Abu Aita insists that he was tricked into appearing in the film and that he has never been involved with the Martyrs' Brigades. In an interview with Time, Abu Aita stated, "It is true that I was jailed in 2003 ... I was active in resisting the occupation, in non-violent ways." After a clip of the interview was played on the Late Show with David Letterman, Ayman called Baron Cohen a "big liar". Abu Aita subsequently filed a $110 million lawsuit against Baron Cohen and David Letterman. The suit was settled before trial.

See also
 Palestinian National Authority
 Popular Resistance Committees
 Child suicide bombers in the Israeli–Palestinian conflict
 List of al-Aqsa Martyrs' Brigades suicide attacks
 Palestinian domestic weapons production

References

External links
 Al-Aqsa Martyrs Brigades website (Arabic)
 Council on Foreign Relations. Terrorism Q&A: al-Aqsa Martyrs Brigades
 Profile: al-Aqsa Martyrs' Brigade
 The al-Aqsa Martyrs Brigades: A political tool with an edge , from Israel's Institute for Counter-Terrorism.
 al-Aqsa Martyrs' Brigades Joins the Fatah Council.
 Daily Life in the Palestininian Authority
 BBC: Palestinian Authority Funds go to Militants

Anti-Zionism in the Palestinian territories
Socialism in the Palestinian territories
Fatah
Paramilitary organizations based in the State of Palestine
Palestinian militant groups
Military wings of political parties
Palestinian terrorism
Resistance movements
Organizations designated as terrorist by Canada
Organisations designated as terrorist by the European Union
Organizations designated as terrorist by Israel
Organisations designated as terrorist by Japan
Organisations designated as terrorist by New Zealand
Organisations designated as terrorist by the United Kingdom
Organizations designated as terrorist by the United States
Organizations based in Asia designated as terrorist
2000 establishments in the Palestinian territories
Temple Mount
Axis of Resistance